MIPTV is an event which takes place annually in Cannes, France, using the facilities and infrastructure which the town has developed over the years to host other important events such as the Cannes Film Festival amongst other events.

It is essentially a content market for co-producing, buying, selling, financing and distributing entertainment content. It provides the people involved in the TV, film, digital and audiovisual content, production and distribution industry a market conference and networking forum to discover future trends and trade content rights on a global level.

This event is very closely related to the MIPCOM event, but retains its distinct focus. The MIPCOM event takes place in the same venue in October each year.

History 
MIP-TV was started in Lyon, France, in 1963 three years after MIFED, the world’s first audiovisual market, had started in Milan, Italy. The first MIP-TV was attended by 119 companies from 19 countries.

In 1965, after a one-year hiatus, MIP-TV moved to Cannes, using the town’s “old” Palais for the exhibition floors. In 1982 the market moved to the new Palais, while the old one became a hotel.
In 1987 the company that organized the market, MIDEM, was sold to the UK’s Television South (TVS) for £5 million. Two years later, TVS sold MIDEM to Reed Exhibitions (for a reported $20 million), which renamed it Reed MIDEM.

Conferences 
Conference panelists and keynotes include CEOs from all the major global media companies like: Leslie Moonves, CBS (US), Jana Bennett BBC (UK), Gerhard Zeiler RTL Group (Luxembourg), Harry Sloan MGM (US), Subhash Chandra ZEE Networks (India), Hyun-Oh Yoo SK Communications/Cyworld (Korea), Paula Wagner at United Artists (US), Ronnie Screwvala UTV (India), Philip Rosedale Second Life (US), Ben Silverman NBC (US), Emilio Azcarraga Televisa (Mexico), Mike Volpi Joost (US), Ken Rutkowski, Wayne Scholes Redtouch Media (US) KenRadio Broadcasting (US). Vertice360º (SPAIN)

Events hosted at MIPTV

MIPFormats
Since 2010 MIPTV launched MIPFormats, "the pre-MIPTV formats conference & pitching showcase" that gathers producers, commissioners, buyers, distributors and aspiring creators of breakthrough formats. The event is organised in association with C21FormatsLab.

In 2011, 665 participants came to MIPFormats, and 401 companies from 57 countries.

MIPDoc
MIPDoc is where international buyers, sellers, producers and commissioners of documentary and factual programmes screen new content and do business. MIPDoc calls itself "the international showcase for documentary screenings". Key MIPDoc 2011 figures:
27,097 screenings
1,399 programmes
767 participants
58 countries

MIPTV 2010 attendance figures
Participants:	11,500
Buyers:	4,000
Exhibitors:    1,500
Countries: 	107

By country:
Europe :             54%
North America:       17%
Asia/Pacific:        15%
Africa/Middle East : 7%
South&Latin America: 3%

Represented industry sectors 

Programme buyers
Distributors and sales agents
Programme producers
Finance partners
Commissioners
Platform owners
Internet and mobile players
Solutions providers
Advertisers
Major global brands
Licensing executives
Advertising and media agencies

References 

Conferences in France
Cannes
Film markets
1964 establishments in France
Recurring events established in 1964